
Yongchang is the transliteration of various Chinese names:

永昌 Yǒngchāng

Locations in China
Yongchang County, a county in Jinchang, Gansu
Baoshan, Yunnan, a city in Yunnan, formerly known as Yongchang

Subdistricts
 Yongchang Subdistrict (永昌街道), a subdistrict of Qidong County in Hunan.
 Yongchang Subdistrict, Dandong (永昌街道), a subdistrict of Zhenxing District in Dandong prefecture-level city, Liaoning.
Yongchang Subdistrict, Changchun, a subdistrict in Chaoyang District, Changchun, Jilin
Yongchang Subdistrict, Lanxi, a subdistrict in Lanxi, Zhejiang
Yongchang Subdistrict, Chengwu County, a subdistrict in Chengwu County, Shandong
Yongchang Subdistrict, Kunming, a subdistrict in Kunming, Yunnan
Yongchang Subdistrict, Baoshan, Yunnan, a subdistrict in Baoshan, Yunnan

Towns
Yongchang, Hangzhou, a town in Hangzhou, Zhejiang
Yongchang, Sichuan, a town in Beichuan Qiang Autonomous County, Sichuan
Yongchang, Wuwei, Gansu, a town in Wuwei, Gansu

Historical eras
Yongchang (322–323), era name used by Emperor Yuan of Jin
Yongchang (689), era name used by Emperor Ruizong of Tang
Yongchang (1644–1645), era name used by Li Zicheng

永常 Yǒng Cháng 
 (died 1755) Qing military general.